Sound of the City: Vol. 1 is the first solo release by Black Milk, a rapper and hip hop producer from Detroit, Michigan.  He had previously released material as part of the hip hop production group, B.R. Gunna, along with Young RJ and Fat Ray.

Track listing

References

Albums produced by Black Milk
2005 debut albums
Black Milk albums